Fairgrounds Park (formerly known as Hagerstown Fairgrounds) is an open land park restored from fairgrounds located off Cleveland Avenue in Hagerstown, Maryland, United States.

Attractions
The park is home to Hagerstown BMX, a biking track, Hagerstown Ice & Sports Complex, a public indoor ice skating complex, and Fairground Softball Association who play at softball fields on the premises. Fairgrounds Park also features walking trails.

History
Fairgrounds Park was once called Hagerstown Fairgrounds and still features the large grandstand seating facility used during the fairgrounds' heyday especially when the Great Hagerstown Fair, a once popular agricultural showcase event, opened each year.

Events
The park also features several events throughout the year such as yearly fireworks display held around the American Independence Day (4 July) and the annual Hagerstown Hispanic Festival that celebrates the heritage of the fastest growing segment of Hagerstown and surrounding Washington County's population. Fairgrounds Park is also home to the Fairgrounds 5K that features a 5,000 metre race or 1 or 2 mile walk.

References

External links
 Hagerstown BMX
 Hagerstown Ice & Sports Complex
 Hagerstown Fairground Softball Association

Hagerstown, Maryland
Parks in Washington County, Maryland
Hagerstown metropolitan area